Ronkonkoma may refer to the following places in Long Island, New York:

 Ronkonkoma, New York, a hamlet.
 Ronkonkoma station
 Ronkonkoma Branch (Long Island Railroad service)
 Lake Ronkonkoma (lake)
 Lake Ronkonkoma, New York, a census-designated place.